Bhairav is a village in Surat district of Gujarat, India. It is situated on the bank of the Tapti River.

References

Villages in Surat district